General elections were held in Rhodesia on 31 August 1977, the last general election in the country dominated by the white minority. Prime Minister Ian Smith, who was conducting negotiations with moderate African nationalists, was forced into an early election by the defection of twelve MPs from his Rhodesian Front party, which denied him the two-thirds majority of the House of Assembly needed to change the constitution. In the event, the Front overwhelmed the breakaway Rhodesian Action Party and all other forces, once again winning every single seat in the 50 seats elected by those of European descent.

Electoral system
The electorate of Rhodesia returned 66 members of the House of Assembly of Rhodesia, in three different classes of seat:

 European roll seats: 50 members were returned from single-member constituencies by voters who were either of European, Asian or mixed (Coloured) descent.
 African roll seats: 8 members were returned from single-member constituencies by voters of African descent.
 Tribal seats: 8 seats were returned by Tribal electoral colleges made up of the Chiefs of the Tribes.

Both European and African rolls had a range of property qualifications. No change to boundaries or the qualification of voters was made compared to the 1974 election.

Results

European roll seats

African seats

Tribal seats
 HIGHVELD: †Bartholomew Augustine Mabika
 KARIBA: †Peter Mhletshwa Nkomo
 LOWVELD: Simeon Chengeta
 MANICA: †Naboth Absalom Gandanzara
 PAGATI: †Fani Mlingo
 PIONEER: Benjamin Panga Mbuisa
 TULI: †Zephaniah Maybin Bafanah Dube
 ZAMBEZI: Mawire Patrick Bwanya

Subsequent by-elections

Pagati
Fani Mlingo died on 15 February 1978. On 31 March 1978, Joseph Jumo Bheka was returned unopposed to replace him. Bheka was a supporter of Bishop Abel Muzorewa.

Lowveld
Simeon Chengeta died on 19 March 1978. On 19 July 1978, a by-election was held in Lowveld. John Adonia Hungwe defeated Simon Dzichaperanhamo Bhene.

Highlands North
A by-election was held in the Highlands North constituency on 21 July 1978 to replace Fergus Blackie, who had been appointed as a Judge and resigned on 15 May 1978. This by-election occurred after the internal settlement agreement, and the Rhodesian Front candidate was therefore opposed not only by the National Unifying Force (pressing for a full settlement with African nationalists) but by two right-wing candidates opposed to any deals: the Rhodesian Action Party and the Rhodesian Conservative Alliance.

Gwelo
Roger Hawkins resigned from the Assembly due to ill health on 30 November 1978, leading to a by-election in Gwelo on 30 January 1979.

Mazoe
George Rollo Hayman resigned on 27 December 1978, claiming that the power-sharing government could easily fall under the control of a terrorist group. He then resigned from the Assembly to seek re-election. This by-election, held on 6 February 1979, was the last election conducted before the advent of the new constitution.

Vacancy at dissolution
Donald Goldin (Wankie) died on 12 February 1979. The seat was not filled before Parliament was dissolved.

References

Elections in Rhodesia
Rhodesia
1977 in Rhodesia
August 1977 events in Africa
Rhodesia
Election and referendum articles with incomplete results